The 1967 Kent State Golden Flashes football team was an American football team that represented Kent State University in the Mid-American Conference (MAC) during the 1967 NCAA University Division football season. In their fourth season under head coach Leo Strang, the Golden Flashes compiled a 4–6 record (1–5 against MAC opponents), finished in sixth place in the MAC, and outscored all opponents by a combined total of 195 to 144.

The team's statistical leaders included Don Fitzgerald with 891 rushing yards, Ron Swartz with 1,029 passing yards, and Will Perry with 601 receiving yards.  Three Kent State players were selected as first-team All-MAC players: defensive tackle Jim Corrigall, halfback Don Fitzgerald, and defensive back Lou Harris.

Leo Strang resigned as Kent State's head football coach on November 21, 1967. He compiled a 16–21–2 record in four seasons as Kent State's head coach.

Schedule

References

Kent State
Kent State Golden Flashes football seasons
Kent State Golden Flashes football